Scotura vestigiata is a moth of the family Notodontidae. It is found in Ecuador.

References

Moths described in 1918
Notodontidae of South America
Fauna of Ecuador